Shamimul Haque, also known as Shamimul Hoque and Bidyut is a first-class and List A cricketer from Bangladesh.  He was born on 6 July 1984 in Rajshahi and is a right-handed batsman and wicket keeper.  Sometimes referred to on scoresheets by his nickname Bidyut he played for Rajshahi Division from 2001/02 to 2005/06.  He also appeared for the Bangladesh Cricket Board XI in 1999/00 and the Bangladesh Cricket Board Development Squad in 2002/03.

He made 3 first-class fifties, with a best of 59 against Dhaka Division and 3 more in one day games, with a best of 60 against Khulna Division.

References 

Bangladeshi cricketers
Rajshahi Division cricketers
Living people
Year of birth missing (living people)
Wicket-keepers